Ilmari Susiluoto (October 15, 1947, Lohja, Finland – March 30, 2016, Helsinki) was a Finnish political scientist, a professor at the University of Helsinki, a senior advisor at the Foreign Ministry of Finland from 1982, an expert in Russian and Soviet history, politics and society, and an author of a number of books in this field.

Bibliography 
 Ph.D.: The origins and development of systems thinking in the Soviet Union (1982) 
 Jättiläinen tuuliajolla (1996) (& Sailas, Valkonen)
 Venäjä ja rosvokapitalismin haaksirikko (1999) (& Kuorsalo, Valkonen)
 Pieni Karjalakirja (1999) ("The Little Book of Karelia")
 Pieni Pietarikirja (2000) ("The Little Book of St. Petersburg")
 Työ tyhmästä pitää, venäläisen huumorin aakkoset ("Work Likes a Fool: The ABCs of Russian humour"), Ajatuskustannus, 2000
 Lavea luonto (2001) ("Generous Nature")
 Diplomatian taiturit (2002)
 Salaisen poliisin valtakunta. KGB, FSB ja suhteet Suomeen (2003) (& Kuorsalo, Valkonen)
 Suuruuden laskuoppi (2006)
 Takaisin Neuvostoliittoon (2006) ("Back to the USSR")
 Vilpittömän ilon valtakunta:  Viina ja Venäjä ("The kingdom of sincere joy: Alcohol in Russia") (2007)
Uusi Karjalakirja ("A New book of Karelia"), Helsinki: Ajatus, 2009. .
Plan Putina: Punaiselta torilta Maidanin aukiolle, Helsingissä: Auditorium, 2015. .

References

External links 
 Susiluoto's curriculum vitae

1947 births
2016 deaths
Finnish political scientists
20th-century Finnish historians
21st-century Finnish historians
People from Lohja
Academic staff of the University of Helsinki